Vibroacoustic stimulation (VAS), sometimes referred to as fetal vibroacoustic stimulation or fetal acoustic stimulation test (FAST), is the application of a vibratory sound stimulus to the abdomen of a pregnant woman to induce FHR (fetal heart rate) accelerations.  The presence of FHR accelerations reliably predicts the absence of fetal metabolic acidemia. Vibroacoustic stimulation is typically used during a nonstress test (NST).

In 2013, the Cochrane Database of Systematic Reviews concluded that there was insufficient evidence from randomized trials to support its use to assess fetal well-being in labor.  A related Cochrane Review, however, concluded that its use in antenatal testing did reduce the incidence of non-reactive cardiotocography and the overall testing time.

References

Tests during pregnancy